Asif Mehmood (born 3 February 1996 in Hyderabad, Sindh) is a Pakistani cricketer who plays for Sindh. Mehmood made his List A debut for Hyderabad Hawks against WAPDA. He was called up to the Pakistan national under-19 cricket team in December 2014. Mehmood made his T20 debut for Sindh against Southern Punjab during the 2022–23 National T20 Cup on 7 September 2022. On 14 September 2022, Mehmood took a hat-trick against Khyber Pakhtunkhwa.

References

External links 
 
 Asif Mehmood at Pakistan Cricket Board

1996 births
Living people
Pakistani cricketers
Sindh cricketers
People from Hyderabad District, Pakistan